Agarista is a genus of plants in the family Ericaceae. Agarista species contain grayanotoxins, a group of closely related neurotoxins named after Leucothoe grayana, native to Japan.

Species
 Agarista boliviensis - from South America,
 Agarista buxifolia - from Réunion
 Agarista eucalyptoides 
 Agarista populifolia (Lam.) Judd—Florida hobblebush
 Agarista salicifolia - from Réunion

There are also about 10 species endemic to Madagascar which are to be transferred to this genus from Agauria.

Plants of the World Online, accepts 32 species, as of January 2022.

Taxonomy
The genus name of Agarista is in honour of Agariste of Sicyon (fl. 6th century BC, around 560 BC). 
It was first described and published in Gen. Hist. Vol.3 on page 837 in 1834.

References

External links
 
 

Vaccinioideae
Ericaceae genera
Plants described in 1834